Middle schools in England are defined in English and Welsh law as being schools in which the age range of pupils starts younger than 10 years and six months and finishes older than 12 years of age.
 
The number of middle schools, including combined schools for children aged between 5 and 12, reached a peak of over 1400 by 1983.
In 2019 there were 107 middle schools remaining in England, operating in just 14 local authority areas.

History
Middle schools were permitted by the Education Act of 1964, which made additional arrangements to allow for schools which crossed the traditional primary-secondary threshold at age 11. Notably, these changes did not define a new type of school, but rather permitted a variation on existing schemes, while providing for regulations which allowed the Secretary of State to determine whether such schools should be treated as primary or secondary. 
This had not been provided for in the Education Act of 1944.

The move, pushed forward by Alec Clegg, then Chief Education Officer of the West Riding of Yorkshire County Council, was initially part of a process to introduce comprehensive schools in secondary education. Clegg proposed a model of middle schools for students aged 9 to 13, crossing the traditional divide at age 11 as early as 1960, with the scheme fully implemented in September 1969. Earlier moves by the local authority in Leicestershire had seen the introduction of two-tier secondary schools for students aged 11 to 14, and 14 to 18 as early as the late 1950s.

The 1964 Act was followed in July 1965 by Circular 10/65 from the then Labour government requesting that local education authorities put forward plans to introduce comprehensive schools in their areas. However, the circular offered only limited support for a change to a three-tier model of middle schools, as the minister had already requested a review of the age of transfer to secondary schools as part of the Plowden enquiry into Children and their primary schools. The Plowden report published in 1967 encouraged the development of middle schools for students aged 8 to 12, developing from existing junior schools.

The law required that all schools were classified as either primary or secondary depending on the age range of students. By 1970, over 100 middle deemed secondary schools were in operation with around 30 deemed primary schools. The number of middle schools, including combined schools for children aged between 5 and 12, rose continuously over the next decade, reaching a peak of over 1400 such schools by 1983, with the primary model rapidly overtaking the secondary following the publication of the Plowden report. However, from that time onwards, the number of middle schools fell each year.

The introduction of the National Curriculum with set Key Stages aligned with the old primary/secondary model further affected the numbers of schools, with a quarter of middle schools closing in the five years after its introduction. Issues of falling rolls, and queries raised about the academic progress of students in three-tier systems led to further closures.

Statistics
In 2019 there were 107 middle schools remaining in England, operating in 14 local authority areas, ranging from the 117-pupil Glendale Middle School in Northumberland, to the 1000-pupil Biggleswade Academy in Biggleswade, Bedfordshire.

In the table below, the URN refers to the unique reference number for each school, linking to its page on the Ofsted website. Also from the table below, it can be seen that middle deemed primary schools have now been almost completely abolished across England.

Middle schools

Bedford Borough
Schools in the unitary authority, operated by Bedfordshire County Council until April 2009. Following consultation in the summer of 2009 the authority intended to re-introduce two-tier provision from 2013, closing all middle schools by 2015. However, on 7 July 2010, it was announced that the change from 3-tier to 2-tier "would be scrapped"; the reason given being cuts in government funding to schools made by the Coalition Government. One Middle School closed in 2011 and two more closed in 2014. 
In July 2015, the borough council announced its intention to support schools in the introduction of a borough-wide move to two-tier provision. As a result, all but one middle school reorganised as primary or secondary by 2019.

Bournemouth, Christchurch and Poole
Poole Borough Council closed all of its middle-deemed-primary schools in August 2013. Bournemouth, Christchurch and Poole Council became the successor Local Education Authority in 2019.

Central Bedfordshire
Schools in the unitary authority, operated by Bedfordshire County Council until April 2009. Some locality groups, such as schools in Dunstable, have undergone local re-organisations to remove middle schools. The local authority supports the principle of moving to primary and secondary provision.

Dorset

Hertfordshire

Kirklees

Newcastle upon Tyne
A new school is proposed to open at Great Park, Gosforth in 2020, which will be a middle school with age range 9-16.

North Tyneside

Northumberland
Northumberland County Council began a process of closing middle schools across the authority in 2006. This was discontinued as a universal policy following funding difficulties but middle schools have continued to close, merge into all through academies or change to primaries with 25 Northumberland middle schools having ceased to be middle schools since 2006 and a further two set to follow in 2019 and 2020.

Somerset

Staffordshire

Suffolk
Suffolk County Council planned to close all middle schools in its authority by 2013, later delayed to 2016. The two remaining schools became part of an all-through academy trust, thereby removing themselves from the local authority-led process to close three-tier schools.

Windsor and Maidenhead

Worcestershire

Authorities where middle schools have been discontinued

Many authorities in regions of England previously had middle schools, with either local areas or whole counties since reverting to the more traditional two-tier model. These are listed briefly by region.

East of England
Norfolk closed its last middle schools - which were deemed primary - in 2008. Suffolk began the process of closing its middle schools in 2006, having reduced its numbers from a high of 40 schools.
The only middle school in Cambridgeshire (which fed into Bedfordshire upper schools) closed in 2018.

East Midlands
Northamptonshire closed its middle schools in and around Northampton in 2002, with its final two middle schools closing in 2015.
Leicestershire had a number of middle schools which covered the 10-14 age range, alongside others which were for Key Stage 3 students (11-14). The last of the middle schools closed in 2017.
Nottinghamshire formerly had a three tier system around Newark-on-Trent and in Mansfield, with the latter closing in 2001.

London
The London Borough of Harrow closed its middle deemed primary schools in 2011.
The London Borough of Merton had about 14 middle schools for the 9-13 age range, which were converted to deemed-primary (8-12) schools in the 1990s. These schools reverted to primary use by 2002.

North East England
The three authorities with existing middle schools (Newcastle, Northumberland, North Tyneside) all closed several middle schools since 1999. A number of towns such as Hexham and Berwick-upon-Tweed still have middle schools.

North West England

South East England
Buckinghamshire's last middle schools closed in the 1990s.
Hampshire inherited middle schools from Southampton City authority which had gone wholly three-tier in 1970 (one of the first two authorities to do so). The schools reverted to the traditional model in the 1990s.
Isle of Wight middle schools closed in 2011. 
Kent's last three middle schools (on the Isle of Sheppey) closed in 2009. The Hoo Peninsula middle schools were reorganised in 1994.
Milton Keynes' system of middle schools was converted to primary schools in 2008.
Oxfordshire closed its last middle-deemed-primary schools in Oxford in 2003.
West Sussex closed middle schools in Crawley in 2004, Adur in 2007, Midhurst & Petworth in 2009 and Worthing in 2015. Its last middle school closed in 2017.

South West England
Devon closed its only middle schools, in Exeter, in 2005.
Dorset has closed a number of middle schools, including four which closed in 2013, as well as fourteen middle-deemed-primary schools which closed in the borough of Poole. 
Wiltshire closed its last middle schools in 2005.

West Midlands
Aldridge-Brownhills, Staffordshire (now West Midlands) - includes the towns of Aldridge and Brownhills as well as the villages of Pelsall and Streetly. Adopted 9–13 middle schools in 1972 (normally on different sites to 5-9 first schools) and retained this system until 1986, when the traditional age ranges were re-established. The authority had been merged into Walsall (which always had the traditional age ranges) in 1974. 

Bewdley and Kidderminster, Worcestershire - adopted 9–13 middle schools in 1972, and the whole area retained this system after 1974 when the two boroughs merged to form Wyre Forest district council. The system was maintained until 2007, when the traditional age ranges were re-established throughout the area.

Dudley, West Midlands (formerly Staffordshire) - incorporating towns of Dudley, Sedgley, Coseley and Brierley Hill. Adopted 8–12 middle schools in 1972 (some on the same site or within the same umbrella as 5-8 first schools) and retained this system until 1990, when the traditional age ranges were re-established. This coincided with a major reorganisation in the borough which saw sixth form facilities largely concentrated in further education colleges rather than secondary schools, as well as several secondary schools being closed or merged.

Halesowen, West Midlands (formerly Worcestershire) - adopted 9–13 middle schools in 1972 and retained this system after 1974 when the town was absorbed into the borough of Dudley (see above) along with Stourbridge (which, along with Kingswinford, always used the traditional age ranges). Was one of the first local authorities to abolish middle schools when in 1982 the traditional age ranges were re-established. This reorganisation also saw the town's three secondary schools serving the 13-18 age range become 11-16 schools, with sixth form facilities concentrated at the expanded college in the town, while the town gained a fourth secondary school with the conversion of a former middle school into an 11-16 school.

Sutton Coldfield (which was in Warwickshire until 1974) adopted 5-8 first schools and 8–12 middle schools in 1972 and did so for 20 years before reverting to 5-7 infant and 7-11 junior schools in 1992.

Northern Warwickshire (the area covered by the boroughs of North Warwickshire, Nuneaton and Bedworth and Rugby – adopted 5–8 first schools and 8–12 middle schools in 1972 and retained this system until 1996, when it reverted to the traditional ages of transfer (which had always applied in the south of the county).

Yorkshire and the Humber
Bradford closed its middle schools between 1998 and 2002, having been the home of the first purpose-built middle school in the country.
Kirklees local authority closed three middle schools in 2012. 
North Yorkshire's two middle schools (at Ingleton and Settle) closed in 2012. Leeds and Wakefield previously operated on the three-tier system before reverting during the 1990s.

Notes

References

External links
National Middle Schools Forum
UK Middle Schools
List of schools in the UK

Mid
 
England